Chesb (also Romanized as Chasb; also known as Chāsp and Chisp) is a village in Ijrud-e Pain Rural District, Halab District, Ijrud County, Zanjan Province, Iran. At the 2006 census, its population was 508, in 137 families.

References 

Populated places in Ijrud County